KTEQ-FM (91.3 FM, "K-Tech") is the campus radio station of the South Dakota School of Mines and Technology (SDSM&T) in Rapid City, South Dakota. The station broadcasts a variety of music formats according to the tastes of the volunteer DJs doing the shows. The only restriction that KTEQ places on the formats of the shows is that the music cannot be Top 40 music. The station was off the air for nearly 13 1/2 years following the loss of its Non-commercial educational broadcast license but returned to air on March 8, 2014. Besides broadcasting over-the-air, the station's programming is also transmitted over channel 6 of the cable television system on the SDSM&T campus and through Internet streaming.

History

WCAT (1922-1952)
The first campus radio station at SDSM&T was WCAT, which broadcast from September 1922 to 1952. The AM station was founded by students from the Electrical Engineering department. The station was licensed to broadcast at a wavelength of 485 meters at a power of 750 watts. Later, the station operated on 1200 kilohertz at a power of 100 watts. The station's call-letters, WCAT, were an abbreviation for "Wildcat Radio." Originally, the studios were located in the basement of the Administration building. In 1928, the studios were moved to the third floor of the Prep Building (later used as the school's gymnasium and currently the Music Center). During the time that WCAT was on the air, the AM station's programming ranged from news to sports and music. In 1952, WCAT was forced to leave the airwaves as a result of pressure from a commercial radio station.

KTEQ (1971-Present)
Efforts to launch a new SDSM&T campus radio station started in 1969. With the assistance of announcer Greg Carey, student body president Jim McGibbney formed the Tech Educational Radio Council (TERC), the governing body of KTEQ. The first studio of KTEQ was located at Surbeck Center; and, tower space for the transmitter was originally donated by KBHE-FM. Initially, KTEQ-FM broadcast at 88.1 MHz with a power of 10 watts. The first broadcast by KTEQ-FM occurred on August 7, 1971, opening with "Also sprach Zarathustra." The first voice to be heard on KTEQ was that of Gary Brown.

US senator and then-US presidential candidate George McGovern gave KTEQ an on-air interview during the 1972 election.

The studios of KTEQ were eventually relocated at the Old Gym building on the SDSM&T campus.

In the early 1980s while still broadcasting at 88.1 MHz, the FCC granted KTEQ permission to increase its radiated power. After the power increase, cable TV subscribers near the broadcast tower complained to their cable provider of KTEQ signal bleeding into their TV programs. Rather than upgrading the shielding of their cable, the cable TV provider chose to grant KTEQ money to change their broadcast frequency so as to not interfere with TV audio signal. In the summer of 1982, KTEQ moved from 88.1 to 91.3 which is farther away from the TV frequency spectrum.

KTEQ radio broadcasts fell silent for a number of months during the mid-1980s. The station finally resumed broadcasts during the spring of 1987. At that time, the station broadcast twenty-four hours per day, seven days per week. Later, the station removed all of the 3AM-to-6AM time slots from its schedule. For many years, the station's tower space was donated by KOTA-TV.

In August 2000, KOTA increased its effective radiated power. As a result, KTEQ had to remove its transmitting hardware from the KOTA tower space, ending KTEQ's radio broadcasts. When KTEQ failed to resume its broadcasts within a year, the station lost its broadcast license in September 2001. New broadcasting hardware was purchased, but the FCC stopped accepting applications for non-commercial broadcast licenses in 2001. While KTEQ waited for the FCC to resume accepting non-commercial license applications, the station continued to transmit its programming over the Internet and over the closed-circuit television on the SDSM&T campus. By 2005, a new studio was located at Surbeck Center.

In May 2011, the campus radio station's long wait finally appeared to be over. On May 3, 2011, SDSM&T was informed by the FCC that the university had beat out four other applicants for a non-profit radio license. The FCC awarded the radio station a construction permit to put up a new transmitter as well as a three-year timeline in which to re-establish the station. The station's management and TERC board hoped to have the station fully up and running on their own tower by the Fall of 2013.

KTEQ encountered many delays, but construction was finally completed in the Spring of 2014. The FCC issued the Station a new Non-Commercial Educational Radio Broadcast License on February 28, 2014. At noon on March 8, KTEQ returned to air, once again opening with "Also Sprach Zarathustra."

References

External links
KTEQ FM Website- the 91.3 KTEQ FM website.
KTEQ Campus Radio from the South Dakota School of Mines and Technology- the SDSMT website.
"D.J.s from Hell" Show website- an early 1990s radio show on KTEQ-FM.

TEQ-FM
Radio stations established in 1971
TEQ
South Dakota School of Mines and Technology
1971 establishments in South Dakota